Grayson Murphy is an American mountain runner.

Amateur career
At West High School (Utah), Murphy was a soccer player and did not run.  Initially she attended Sweet Briar College as a soccer player.  She started her track career competing as a walk-on for the Santa Clara Broncos and finished competing for the Utah Utes, where she was an All-American in cross-country, indoor track, and outdoor track.

International career
Murphy won the 2019 World Mountain Running Championships in her debut at the event.  She is also the XTERRA trail run world champion.

References

1995 births
Living people
21st-century American women
American female mountain runners
Santa Clara Broncos athletes
Sweet Briar College alumni
Utah Utes athletes
World Mountain Running Championships winners
Sportspeople from Utah